2018 Gubernatorial elections in Russia were held in 26 federal subjects of Russia.

22 federal subjects had direct elections and 4 federal subjects had indirect elections of governors.

The main election day was held on 9 September. In addition, the second round was held in four regions: in two regions it was held on 26 September, in one region on 11 November. In Primorsky Krai, the second round was held on 16 September, but its results were declared invalid, in connection with which new elections will be held on 16 December. In addition, the election of the Governor of the Nenets Autonomous Okrug was held on 1 October.

List

Direct elections

Indirect elections

References

 
gubernatorial
2018
gubernatorial